Playlist: The Very Best of Basia is a greatest hits compilation album by Polish-born singer Basia. It was released by Epic Records on 15 October 2013 as part of Sony's environmentally friendly Playlist compilation series. The CD compiles all of her chart hits from the 1980s and 1990s. Of the 14 tracks offered, the first comes from her days with the band Matt Bianco and the album Whose Side Are You On? (1984). This is followed by five songs from her debut album, Time and Tide (1987), four from her second album, London Warsaw New York (1990), and three from her third solo album, The Sweetest Illusion (1994). The final track is from an earlier compilation album, Clear Horizon – The Best of Basia (1998).

Track listing

References

External links
 The official Basia website
 Playlist: The Very Best of Basia on Discogs

2013 compilation albums
Basia compilation albums
Epic Records compilation albums